The Heartbreak Kid is a 2007 American black comedy film directed by the Farrelly brothers (who also helped to write the film alongside Leslie Dixon and Scot Armstrong). It is a remake of the 1972 film of the same name and stars Ben Stiller in the main role, Michelle Monaghan, Malin Åkerman, Jerry Stiller, Rob Corddry, Carlos Mencia, Scott Wilson, and Danny McBride. It tells the story of a sports shop owner who ends up in a rushed marriage with a shrewish woman and meets a true love interest during a trip to Mexico.

The film was met with negative reviews.

Plot
Eddie Cantrow, owner of a San Francisco sports shop, is single but ambivalent about relationships. One day, seeing a purse-snatching, he tries unsuccessfully to recover it. He and its owner Lila exchange pleasantries, and Eddie finds her attractive.

They begin dating and get serious quickly. Suddenly, her company requires Lila to move to Holland, but her company does not deploy married employees abroad. At the urging of both his father Doc and best friend Mac, Eddie marries her after only dating a few months.

Before their wedding night, Eddie and Lila have never been sexually intimate nor spent much time getting to know each other. During the drive to their honeymoon in Los Cabos, Mexico, Eddie learns things about Lila he finds annoying, such as incessant singing.

Arriving at their room, they have sex for the first time and Eddie learns that Lila is aggressive in bed. His disaffection deepens when she divulges her history of substance abuse which resulted in a deviated septum, so she sprays drinks out of her nose. He learns she was only a volunteer, and the "thief" was an ex that she owed money to. Eddie realizes he made a mistake marrying Lila as he rushed into it. Not in love with her, he can't stand some of her newly discovered behavior and bad habits.

On the beach, Lila insists on using mineral oil, refusing sunblock. She then blames Eddie for her second-degree sunburn. As the enormity of his mistake sinks in, he meets Miranda, a vacationer with her family from Mississippi. Immediately attracted, Eddie spend most of his honeymoon with Miranda and her family while the sunburn confines Lila to their room.  Miranda's family all like Eddie except for her cousin, Martin, who senses he is hiding something. Confiding in Mac, he states he made a mistake marrying Lila and he is falling for Miranda.

Later that same evening, there is a misunderstanding between Eddie and Miranda's family because they hear he came to Mexico to mourn his wife who was killed by a maniac with an ice pick.

Later on, Eddie decides to propose divorce to Lila at lunch, but then Martin and his brother Buzz confront him. When Miranda learns about Lila, she and Eddie fall into the ocean and Eddie is stung by a jellyfish where Lila treats the stings by urinating on him. After the chaos, Lila and Miranda both abandon him (Miranda for his lies and Lila for his wish for a divorce). Lila even destroys Eddie's passport stranding him in Mexico.

Eddie sinks into depression, annoying Mexican Manuel with his problems. Coerced by Uncle Tito, he decides to go to Mississippi to make amends with Miranda. Border patrol agents repeatedly catch Eddie attempting to cross the U.S. border illegally with help from Tito, but he finally gets to Oxford, Mississippi.

Upon meeting Miranda's family, he learns that she has married her previous boyfriend. Despite promising to leave Miranda alone, Eddie sneaks in and awakens Miranda as her husband sleeps. Her husband wakes up when Martin bursts in and attacks Eddie with a baseball bat until Doc intervenes. Eddie agrees to leave if Miranda says she truly loves her new husband, which she does. Eddie leaves with Doc, without knowing that Miranda looks longingly from her balcony as he walks away.

Eighteen months later, Eddie is divorced from Lila (who got his sports store) and he moves permanently to Mexico to sell sporting goods on the beach. Some time later, Miranda arrives in Mexico and finds Eddie. She has left her husband, is single, and still in love with him. Eddie is thrilled. In a twist ending, Miranda is unaware that Eddie had remarried to a woman named Consuela, causing Eddie to go through the same predicament again.

In a post-credits scene, it is revealed that Lila had returned to Los Cabos and stayed at a hotel room with a donkey whom she has sexual relations with.

Cast
 Ben Stiller as Edward "Eddie" Cantrow, a sports store owner who marries too soon and goes through turmoil.
 Michelle Monaghan as Miranda, a woman in Mexico who Eddie believes is his true soulmate.
 Malin Åkerman as Lila Cantrow, Eddie's wife who at first is everything Eddie wants, but later turns out to be a total nightmare due to her bad habits.
 Jerry Stiller as Doc Cantrow, Eddie's father who often visits Las Vegas and gives Eddie rather vulgar tips on women.
 Rob Corddry as Mac, Eddie's best friend who is in a struggling marriage himself.
 Carlos Mencia as Uncle Tito, the owner of the hotel in Los Cabos that Eddie and Lila stay in on their honeymoon.
 Scott Wilson as Boo, Miranda's uncle and Martin and Buzz's dad.
 Danny McBride as Martin, Miranda's cousin who is suspicious of Eddie and treats him coldly.
 Roy Jenkins as Buzz, Martin's brother who treats Eddie more fairly.
 Ali Hillis as Jodi, Eddie's ex-girlfriend who gets married at the start of the film.
 Amy Sloan as Deborah, Martin's wife.
 Kayla Kleevage as Doc's Vegas Companion, a huge-chested woman who is in the scene with Doc during his phone conversation with Eddie.
 Stephanie Courtney as Gayla, Buzz's wife.
 Polly Holliday as Beryll, Boo's wife, Miranda's aunt, and Martin and Buzz's mom.
 Eva Longoria as Consuela Cantrow, a Mexican woman who became Eddie's second wife at the end of the film sometime during the 18 month gap.
 Lauren Bowles as Tammy, Mac's wife who ends up in a dysfunctional marriage with him.
 Luis Accinelli as Manuel, an elderly Mexican who Eddie annoys after being stranded in Mexico.
 Jerry Sherman as Anderson, Miranda's granddad.
 Dean Norris as Jodi's father.

Promotion
During the film's preview at the 2007 San Diego Comic-Con, a sex scene from the film was cut due to backlash for the nudity in prior films at the convention such as 300 and Borat.

Reception

Box office
The film grossed  in 3,219 theaters in its opening weekend, putting it in second place at the box office in North America. The film eventually grossed a total of  worldwide, which includes $36,787,257 in North America and $90,979,393 in other territories.

Critical response
Review aggregation website Rotten Tomatoes gives the film a score of 29% based on 157 reviews, with an average rating of 4.56/10. The website's critical consensus reads: "Despite some amiable performances, The Heartbreak Kid is neither as daring nor as funny as the Farrelly Brothers' earlier films". On Metacritic, the film had an average score of 46 out of 100, based on 30 reviews, which indicates "mixed or average reviews". Audiences polled by CinemaScore gave the film an average grade of "C" on an A+ to F scale.

Peter Travers (of Rolling Stone) declared the film the year's Worst Remake on his list of the Worst Movies of 2007. Jonathan Rosenbaum (of The Chicago Reader) dismissed it as "brain-dead".

References

External links
 
 
 
 
 

2007 films
American romantic comedy films
2007 romantic comedy films
Remakes of American films
Films set in San Francisco
Films shot in Mexico
Films shot in San Francisco
DreamWorks Pictures films
Davis Entertainment films
Films directed by the Farrelly brothers
Films produced by John Davis
Films set in the San Francisco Bay Area
Paramount Pictures films
Films about marriage
Films about honeymoon
Films with screenplays by Leslie Dixon
Films with screenplays by the Farrelly brothers
2000s English-language films
2000s American films